Rahul Sanghvi  (born 3 September 1974) is an Indian cricketer, specialising in left arm orthodox spin. He played for the Delhi state team. He played one Test match, which was the first Test between Australia and India in 2001 but was dropped after Australia claimed a 10 wicket victory. He played in 10 One Day Internationals. He has played first-class cricket for three teams: Delhi, North Zone and Railways.

In 1997–98 he set a world record when he took 8–15 for Delhi against Himachal Pradesh in a Ranji Trophy One Day match which later in 2019 Shahbaz Nadeem broke,a two-decade-old world record for best bowling figures in List A cricket, with a haul of 8/10 against Rajasthan. In 2016 he was found violating the conflict of interest for performing his existing role at IPL while being a DDCA selector.

References 

1974 births
Living people
India One Day International cricketers
India Test cricketers
Indian cricketers
North Zone cricketers
Railways cricketers
Delhi cricketers
Cricketers at the 1998 Commonwealth Games
Gujarati people
Commonwealth Games competitors for India